NH 149 may refer to:

 National Highway 149 (India)
 New Hampshire Route 149, United States